Michael Shebanow is an electrical engineer at Samsung in San Jose, California. He was named a Fellow of the Institute of Electrical and Electronics Engineers (IEEE) in 2015 for his contributions to superscalar out-of-order processors.

References

20th-century births
Living people
American electrical engineers
Fellow Members of the IEEE
Year of birth missing (living people)
Place of birth missing (living people)